Tuthilltown Bridge is located in the Town of Gardiner in Ulster County, New York, United States, approximately 1 miles (1.6 km) west of the eponymous hamlet. It carries US 44/NY 55 across the north-flowing Wallkill River just downstream from where it is joined by the Shawangunk Kill, its largest tributary. It is a steel through truss bridge built in 1938 and reconstructed in 1993

The bridge was built to replace a ford, still visible upstream from the bridge. Tuthilltown, the settlement that once flourished in the area, had been the western terminus of the Farmer's Turnpike, built in 1850 to provide local farmers with access to shipping on the Hudson River 20 miles (32 km) to the east. The area is today known just as Tuthill, but the bridge, the Tuthilltown Gristmill and a nearby road retain the old name.

See also

References

Bridges in Ulster County, New York
Truss bridges in the United States
Bridges completed in 1938
Bridges over the Wallkill River
Road bridges in New York (state)
U.S. Route 44
Bridges of the United States Numbered Highway System
Steel bridges in the United States